Charles Symmes (April 4, 1798 – August 25, 1868) was an American-born business owner and politician in Quebec. Considered the father of Aylmer, he was its mayor from 1855 to 1858 and again from 1860 to 1862.

He was born in Charlestown, Massachusetts, the son of Captain John Symmes and Elizabeth Wright, the sister of Philemon Wright. In 1819, he was hired by his uncle as clerk and bookkeeper. Philemon's oldest son, Philemon Junior, owned or was in charge of most of the Wright Farms, including the Chaudière Lake Farm at Turnpike's End. In 1819, Philemon Junior had built the farm with a house as well as a hotel and two stores to accommodate all the travelers who journeyed above the falls, up the Ottawa River.

In November 1821, Philemon Junior died suddenly in a tragic coach accident. As a result, Philemon Sr. needed a new manager for the Chaudière Lake Farm. His other sons were busy managing the family's timber business and so he chose Charles to be the new manager. The hotel was made ready for his occupancy in 1822.

In October 1823, the arrangement was made official and more equitable, with Charles named a partner of the Farm & Landing with P. Wright & Sons in a lease agreement. Charles would manage the farm and tavern/store at the waterfront. A dispute arose when the company did not honour the terms of the agreement. Charles left P. Wright & Sons to pursue business on his own at Turnpike's End. Charles acquired property and, in 1830, had his property surveyed and divided up into building lots for sale to create a "government village", as per the Crown's directive. He developed the waterfront, created a dock and partnered with John Egan and Joseph-Ignace Aumond in building and running the steamboat Lady Colborne, the first to operate in that area.

In 1831, he built his own hotel, the Symmes Inn, also later known as l'Auberge Symmes.

Originally known as Chaudière Farm Village and Turnpike's End, then called Symmes' Landing, the government village was renamed Aylmer in 1831 to honour Lord Aylmer, the governor of Lower Canada. Symmes donated land for the construction of churches and public buildings. He also served on the board for the Aylmer Academy. He was a member of the Aylmer municipal council from 1847 to 1851 and from 1852 to 1855. He served as prefect for Ottawa County, secretary-treasurer for the county agricultural society, and revenue inspector for the district.

Symmes married Hannah Ricker in 1824. Together, they had nine children: Abigail, Elizabeth, Charles, John, Thomas, Edmund, Tiberius and Hannah. Many of the streets of Aylmer are named for their children. Symmes died in Aylmer at the age of 70.

The hotel that he built later became a museum and has been designated a heritage building by Quebec.

References 

1798 births
1868 deaths
People from Charlestown, Boston
American emigrants to pre-Confederation Quebec
Mayors of places in Quebec
Immigrants to Lower Canada
Anglophone Quebec people